Macerata  may refer to:
 Macerata, a city and comune in central Italy, the county seat of the province of Macerata in the Marche region
 Macerata Campania, a comune  in the Province of Caserta in the Italian region Campania
 Macerata Feltria, is a comune in the Province of Pesaro e Urbino in the Italian region Marche
 153rd Infantry Division Macerata, an infantry division of the Italian Army during World War II
 Macerata (volleyball), a professional volleyball team based in Treia, Italy
 Macerata (province), a province in the Marche region of Italy